Utricularia steenisii is a small annual carnivorous plant that belongs to the genus Utricularia. It is endemic to Sumatra and is only known from higher elevations in Aceh. It was first collected in 1937 by Cornelis Gijsbert Gerrit Jan van Steenis, for whom the species is named. Peter Taylor misidentified a specimen of U. steenisii as U. salwinensis in 1977, but upon viewing further specimens, he realized the nature of this new species and formally described it in 1986.

See also 
 List of Utricularia species

References 

steenisii
Carnivorous plants of Asia
Endemic flora of Sumatra
Plants described in 1986